The 2011 Farmers Classic, presented by Mercedes-Benz, was a tennis tournament played on outdoor hard courts in Los Angeles. It was the 85th edition of the Los Angeles Open, and was part of the Olympus US Open Series of the 2011 ATP World Tour. It took place at the Los Angeles Tennis Center on the campus of UCLA, from July 25 through July 31, 2011, with total player compensation in excess of $1 million. The events were televised by ESPN2 and the Tennis Channel. Following the tournament, a Coldplay concert was held on August 3 and broadcast a portion on ABC's Jimmy Kimmel Live!.

Juan Martín del Potro, who won the 2008 Countrywide Classic and 2009 US Open was one of the first players signed on to play in the tournament. The Argentinean reached a career high of No. 4 in 2010.

Unseeded Ernests Gulbis won the singles title and the accompanying first-prize money of $113,000.

ATP entrants

Seeds

*Seedings based on the July 18, 2011 rankings.

Other entrants
The following players received wildcards into the singles main draw:
  Robby Ginepri
  Tommy Haas
  Steve Johnson

The following players received entry as a special exempt into the singles main draw:
  Ryan Harrison

The following players received entry from the qualifying draw:

  Laurynas Grigelis
  Greg Jones
  Daniel Kosakowski
  Tim Smyczek

Finals

Singles

 Ernests Gulbis defeated  Mardy Fish, 5–7, 6–4, 6–4
This was Gulbis's first title of the year and his second career ATP title.

Doubles

 Mark Knowles /  Xavier Malisse defeated  Somdev Devvarman /  Treat Conrad Huey, 7–6(7–3), 7–6(12–10)

Notes
 As a part of this year's tournament, "An Evening with Betty White" was presented prior to the tournament on July 22 at UCLA's Royce Hall.
 July 30, 2011 – Peter Fleming, the Farmers Classic 1979 singles and 1983 doubles champion, was named 2011 Tournament Honoree.
 August 3, 2011 – "An Evening with Coldplay" concert.

References

External links
Official website

2011 ATP World Tour
2011
July 2011 sports events in the United States
2011 in sports in California
2011 in American tennis